Vicente Haro Marón (1 November 1930 – 14 April 2010) was a Spanish film, TV and theater actor. He starred in films with Agustín González, Fernando Guillén, Jesús Puente, Juanjo Menéndez, Manuel Alexandre, José Bódalo, Juan Diego and Emilio Gutiérrez Caba. He married actress Ana María Vidal, with whom he had a son, Vicente Haro Vidal. He is also the father of actor Enrique San Francisco, but did not meet him until Enrique was seventeen years old. Enrique hasn't got the surname Haro because his mother, actress Enriqueta Cobo, was very angry with Vicente. He died on 14 April 2010 at age 80.

Filmography

Films

Television

Theater

References

External links
 

1930 births
2010 deaths
Spanish male film actors
Spanish male stage actors
Spanish male voice actors
Spanish male television actors
20th-century Spanish male actors
21st-century Spanish male actors